Mar, mar or MAR may refer to:

Culture 
 Mar or Mor, an honorific in Syriac
 Earl of Mar, an earldom in Scotland
 MAA (singer) (born 1986), Japanese
 Marathi language, by ISO 639-2 language code
 March, as an abbreviation for the third month of the year in the Gregorian calendar
 Biblical abbreviation for the Gospel of Mark

Places
 Mar, Isfahan, a village in Iran
 Mar, Markazi, a village in Iran
 Mar, Russia, in the Sakha Republic
 Marr, a region of Scotland
 Mesoamerican region, an economic region
 Mid-Atlantic Ridge, a ridge on the floor of the Atlantic Ocean
 Morocco, ISO 3166-1 alpha-3 and IOC country code

People 
 Mar (surname), a Chinese and Scottish surname (including a list of people with the surname)
 Mar Abhai, a saint of the Syriac Orthodox Church
 Mar Amongo (1936–2005), a Filipino illustrator
 Mar Cambrollé (born 1957), Spanish trans rights activist
 Mar Roxas (born 1957), Filipino politician

Other uses 
 MÄR (Marchen Awakens Romance), a 2003 Japanese manga series
 Mar (boat), Halifax, Nova Scotia
 Mauritius, UNDP country code
 La Chinita International Airport, Maracaibo, Venezuela, IATA code
 Minorities at Risk, a project at the University of Maryland
 Mixed Antiglobulin Reaction (MAR), see antisperm antibodies 
 Marriott International (stock symbol MAR)
 Matrix attachment region of eukaryotes
 Medication Administration Record
 Memory address register, in a computer CPU
 Minimum Angle of Resolution, a measure of visual acuity
 Missing at random in statistical analysis, a type of missing data
 Model Audit Rule 205 or MAR 205 in US financial reporting
 Molapo Armoured Regiment, an armoured regiment of the South African Army
 Modified aspect ratio of a film
 Mouvement Action Renouveau (Action Movement for Renewal), Republic of Congo

See also
 Marr (disambiguation)
 Marre
 Mer (disambiguation)